Llanyrafon is a suburb of Cwmbran and a community in the county borough of Torfaen in south east Wales. It lies within the boundaries of the historic county of  Monmouthshire and the preserved county of Gwent.

Etymology

Sometimes written on old maps and documents as Lan-yr-avon, Llan-yr-avon, or Llanyravon, the name literally translates as 
"Church by the River". However, Llan meaning "Church"' is usually followed by a saint's name, and the resulting name is usually associated with a parish church. Neither is true for Llanyrafon, so the older meaning of  Llan as "an enclosed piece of land" may apply.  Llan  means an enclosed parcel of land belonging to a church though a church may not necessarily have been present on the land as for instance in the case of Llandaff. In which the Daff part refers to the river Taff.  Such could apply to llanyrafon.

Location
Llanyrafon lies to the east of the Afon Llwyd and Cwmbran town centre, west of the A4042 dual carriageway and south of Croesyceiliog.

History
Built in the late 1950s, Llanyrafon is mainly residential but does include a municipal golf course; 3-star Hotel (Commodore Hotel on Mill Lane - closed in 2011 and now demolished to make way for a new housing development); small shopping precinct known as Llanyrafon Lakeside Shops and the large Boating Lake Park & South Fields. The Boating Lake Park includes (as the name suggests) a large lake which is home to various wildfowl birds such as swans, mallards and moorhens. There is also a large adventure playground as well as various football and rugby pitches. In recent years, the addition of a skateboarding/roller blading park was made to this area. Most recently there has been a re-vamp of the Boating Lake with the addition of an island. There is one public house, 'The Crow's Nest', that serves 'pub-grub' food.

The X24, a major bus service operated by Stagecoach South Wales, runs through Llanyrafon from Cwmbran town centre to Newport.  Phil Anslow also provides a regular service from Cwmbran town centre to Newport via Llanyrafon as well as service which links Llanyrafon to the town centre.

See also

Cwmbran
Torfaen County Borough Council
Grade II* listed buildings in Torfaen
Scheduled Monuments in Torfaen
Communities of Torfaen

References

Barber, Chris, 1999. EASTERN VALLEY The Story of Torfaen. Blorenge Books.

External links
BBC article on Llanyrafon Mill
Llanyrafon Manor - Rural Heritage Centre

Suburbs of Cwmbran
Communities in Torfaen